Archistar is a software framework to build distributed storage system on the basis of secure fragmentation and information dispersal. It is dedicated to the development of a secure distributed storage architecture for trustworthy cloud usage. The Archistar framework combines methods from Byzantine fault tolerance, secret sharing, and additional tools from cloud cryptography to achieve its goal and parts of it are released as open-source software. A non-functional goal is to provide a base framework for further research into this topic: to achieve this, focus has been set on readability and open-source licenses have been used for all prototype code.

The first version of the Java implementations have been developed in a research project funded by the Austrian Ministry of Transport and the current version is maintained and extended as part of the EU funded research project PRISMACLOUD

Components 

To achieve better readability self-contained aspects were extracted into libraries:
 Secret sharing library on github
 BFT state-machine library on github

Current Features as of November 2013 

 Written in Java7 under an open source license (GPLv2 and LGPLv2)
 Secret sharing through RabinIDS, ShamirPSS, Krawczyk, RabinBenOr
 Byzantine Fault Tolerance through a custom BFT layer
 Tries to not reinvent the wheel, uses existing software as Netty.io
 Developed by Austrian Institute of Technology

See also 

 Byzantine Fault Tolerance
 secure multi-party computation
 Shamir's Secret Sharing

Notes

External links 
 Archistar homepage

Science and technology in Austria